A super tweeter is a speaker driver intended to produce ultra high frequencies in a multi-driver loudspeaker system. Its purpose is to recreate a more realistic sound field, often characterized as "airy-ness". Super tweeters are sometimes found in high fidelity speaker systems and sometimes even in home theater systems. They are used to supplement the sound of tweeters by reproducing frequencies which the tweeter may produce only with a narrow polar output, or perhaps with distortion.

A super tweeter is generally intended to respond well into ultrasonic frequencies over 20 kHz, the commonly accepted upper frequency limit of human hearing. Super tweeters have been designed for psychoacoustic testing, for extended-range digital audio such as Super Audio CD intended for audiophiles, for biologists performing research on animal response to sounds, and for ambient sound systems in zoos. Ribbon tweeters have been made that can reproduce 80 kHz and even 100 kHz.

See also
 Loudspeaker
 Loudspeaker enclosure
 Audio crossover
 Full-range speaker
 Tweeter
 Midrange speaker
 Woofer
 Subwoofer

References

External links
 Enjoy The Music.com

Loudspeakers